International Game Theory Review is a peer-reviewed academic journal published quarterly by World Scientific. It contains articles and surveys on theories and applications of game theory in socio-economic and political contexts and other related areas. Aside from regular articles on theory, methodology and application of games, it also includes case studies and articles on policy-making issues. The current managing editor is David Yeung (Hong Kong Shue Yan University).

Abstracting and indexing 
The journal is abstracted and indexed in:

External links 
 

Mathematics journals
Economics journals
Publications established in 1999
World Scientific academic journals
Quarterly journals
English-language journals